Tırmıl railway station is a railway station in Mersin, Turkey, on the Adana-Mersin railway between Mersin and Karacailyas railway stations Located within the Akdeniz ilçe (district) in east Mersin, the station is located at the west end of Tırmıl yard. TCDD Taşımacılık operates daily regional train service from Mersin to Adana, İskenderun and İslahiye, with a total of 12 daily trains stopping at Tırmıl, in each direction.

External links
TCDD Taşımacılık

Buildings and structures in Mersin
Railway stations in Mersin Province
Transport in Mersin